During the 2012–13 season, the Peterborough Phantoms participated in the semi-professional English Premier Ice Hockey League. It was the 10th year of Ice Hockey played by the Peterborough Phantoms.

Results

September 2012

October 2012

November 2012

December 2012

January 2013

February 2013

References

External links
 Peterborough Phantoms Official Club Website

Slou
2012-2013